The Dürrensee is a lake in the Dolomites in South Tyrol, Italy.

References 
Municipality of Toblach

External links 

Lakes of South Tyrol